Pyrausta rubricalis, the variable reddish pyrausta moth, is a moth in the family Crambidae. It was described by Jacob Hübner in 1796. It is found in North America, where it has been recorded from Illinois to New York, south to Florida and Louisiana. It is also reported from the west coast, from southern California to Washington. The wingspan is about 15 mm and adults have been recorded on wing from March to October.

Images

References

Moths described in 1796
rubricalis
Moths of North America